Narrow Head is an American rock band from Texas. The group was founded by vocalist Jacob Duarte in Dallas, but the band is now based in Houston.

History
Narrow Head formed in 2013 and released their debut album, Satisfaction, in 2016. By this time, the group's membership had coalesced into the trio of Jacob Duarte on vocals, William Menjivar on guitar, and Carson Wilcox on drums. In 2018, the group released the single "Bulma" and did a tour of the western United States. In 2020, Narrow Head signed with Run For Cover Records and released the singles "Night Tryst", "Stuttering Stanley, and "Hard to Swallow" in preparation for their sophomore album, 12th House Rock. Run for Cover reissued Satisfaction in 2021 on vinyl.

On June 12, 2022, the band released the stand-alone single "T.W.I.N." through Run for Cover Records.

On November 7, 2022, the group released "Moments of Clarity" through Run for Cover Records as the debut single for their upcoming album Moments of Clarity. On December 13, 2022, another single from the album, entitled “Gearhead”, was released. The album is to release in February 2023.

Members
 Current members
Jacob Duarte – vocals, guitars, synthesizers
Carson Wilcox – drums, programming 
William Menjivar – guitars, bass
Kora Puckett – guitars, backing vocals, synthesizers 

 Former members
 Ryan Hughes – guitars, vocals
 Jay Chary – bass 
 Keaton Khonsari – drums 
 Ryan Seelig – bass/guitar 
 Ryan Chavez – bass

Discography

Studio albums 
Satisfaction (self-released, 2016)
12th House Rock (Run for Cover Records, 2020)
Moments of Clarity (Run for Cover Records, 2023)

EPs 

 Demonstration MMXIII (self-released/Rarebear Records, 2013)
 Far Removed (self-released/Floodlight Records, 2014)
 Coursing Through (Advanced Perspective, 2019)

Singles 

 "Cool in Motion" (self-released, 2016)
 "Snoozy" (self-released, 2017)
 "Bulma" (VJ029, 2018)
 "Hard to Swallow" (Run for Cover, 2020)
 "Stuttering Stanley" (Run for Cover, 2020)
 "Night Tryst" (Run for Cover, 2020)
 "T.W.I.N." (Run for Cover, 2022)
 "Moments of Clarity" (Run for Cover, 2022)
 "Gearhead" (Run for Cover, 2022)
 "Caroline" (Run for Cover, 2023)

References

Musical groups from Houston
Musical groups from Dallas
Rock music groups from Texas
Run for Cover Records artists